PECO is a British manufacturer of model railway accessories.

Peco, or PECO may also refer to:
 PECO Energy, formerly the Philadelphia Electric Company, now a subsidiary of Exelon
 Panay Electric Company (PECO), an electric power distribution company in the Philippines
 peco (unit of measurement), used for quantifying the dielectric properties of concrete
 Asim Peco, linguist
 Pakistan Engineering Company (PECO), an engineering company in Pakistan
 PECO-InspX, a global manufacturer of Fill Level Monitoring, X-ray Inspection and related industrial systems
 Photoelectrochemical oxidation, a process by which incident light enables a semiconductor material to promote a catalytic oxidation reaction

See also
 Pecos (disambiguation)
 Pecco (disambiguation)